Massachusetts House of Representatives' 1st Barnstable district in the United States is one of 160 legislative districts included in the lower house of the Massachusetts General Court. It covers part of Barnstable County. Republican Tim Whelan of Brewster has represented the district since 2015. He will face Democrat Josh Mason in the 2020 Massachusetts general election.

Towns represented
The district includes the following localities:
 part of Barnstable
 part of Brewster
 Dennis
 part of Yarmouth

The current district geographic boundary overlaps with that of the Massachusetts Senate's Cape and Islands district.

Former locales
The district previously covered:
 Bourne, circa 1927 
 Falmouth, circa 1872, 1927 
 Mashpee, circa 1927 
 Sandwich, circa 1872, 1927

Representatives
 Zenas D. Basset, circa 1858 
 John A. Baxter, circa 1858 
 Paul Wing, circa 1858 
 John S. Fish, circa 1859 
 Nathaniel Hinckley, circa 1859 
 William Nye, Jr., circa 1859 
 Joshua Crowell, circa 1888 
 Albert R. Eldridge, circa 1888 
 Thomas Pattison, circa 1908
 George Dennis, circa 1918
 Edward Carroll Hinckley, circa 1923
 William Jones, circa 1935
 Henry Ellis, circa 1945
 Allan Francis Jones, circa 1951 
 John Bowes, circa 1967
 Bernard Wilber, circa 1975 
 Haden Greenhalgh, circa 1984
 Henri S. Rauschenbach, 1985–1988
 Edward B. Teague III, 1989–1997
 Thomas N. George, 1997–2005
 Cleon Turner, 2005 – January 6, 2015
 Timothy R. Whelan, 2015-current

See also
 List of Massachusetts House of Representatives elections
 Other Barnstable County districts of the Massachusetts House of Representatives: 2nd, 3rd, 4th, 5th; Barnstable, Dukes and Nantucket
 List of Massachusetts General Courts
 List of former districts of the Massachusetts House of Representatives

Images
Portraits of legislators

References

Further reading

External links

 Ballotpedia
  (State House district information based on U.S. Census Bureau's American Community Survey).
 League of Women Voters of the Cape Cod Area

House
Government of Barnstable County, Massachusetts